Rostislav Jeřábek (born 29 March 1962 in Ostrava) is a retired Czech professional footballer who played for several clubs in Europe.

Club career
Jeřábek spent most of his professional career with FC Vítkovice. He had a spell in the Turkish Super Lig with Adanaspor and Konyaspor.

References

1962 births
Living people
Czechoslovak footballers
Czech footballers
Czech First League players
Veikkausliiga players
MFK Vítkovice players
Adanaspor footballers
Konyaspor footballers
FC Haka players
Czech expatriate footballers
Süper Lig players
Expatriate footballers in Turkey
Czechoslovak expatriate sportspeople in Turkey
Sportspeople from Ostrava
Expatriate footballers in Finland
Czech expatriate sportspeople in Finland
Association football forwards